The women's 10 kilometres walk event at the 1991 Summer Universiade was held at the Don Valley Stadium in Sheffield on 23 July 1991. This was the first time that this event was held at the Universiade replacing the 5 kilometres distance.

Results

References

Athletics at the 1991 Summer Universiade
1991